St Mary's Church is a 14th-century parish church dedicated to St Mary the Virgin in Ticehurst, East Sussex, England. Part of the Diocese of Chichester, the church has grade II* listed building status. In the church is a brass memorial to John Wyborne and his wives Cecily and Agnes, from about 1365.

The hymnwriter Francis Pott served as parish priest at Ticehurst from 1861 to 1866.

See also
List of places of worship in Rother

References

External links
 

Church of England church buildings in East Sussex
Grade II* listed churches in East Sussex
Mary